is a Kōya-san Shingon temple in Awa, Tokushima Prefecture, Japan. Temple 10 on the Shikoku 88 temple pilgrimage, the main image is of Senjū Kannon. The temple is said to have been founded by Kōbō Daishi, who carved the image. The five-bay, two-storey Daitō of 1618 has been designated an Important Cultural Property.

See also
 Important Cultural Properties of Japan
 Shikoku 88 temple pilgrimage

References

Buddhist pilgrimage sites in Japan
Buddhist temples in Tokushima Prefecture
Important Cultural Properties of Japan
Kōyasan Shingon temples